The KNVB Cup 1973–74 (the 56th edition) started on September 26, 1973. The final was held on 1 May 1974 with PSV beating NAC 6–0 and winning the cup for the second time.

Teams
 All 18 participants of the Eredivisie 1973-74, entering in the second round
 All 20 participants of the Eerste Divisie 1973-74
 8 teams from lower (amateur) leagues

First round 

1 Eerste Divisie; A Amateur teams

Second round 
The Eredivisie teams entered this round.

E Eredivisie

Third round

From quarterfinals to final

Details of the final

PSV would participate in the Cup Winners' Cup.

See also
 Eredivisie 1973-74
 Eerste Divisie 1973-74

External links
 Netherlands Cup Full Results 1970–1994

KNVB Cup seasons
Knvb Cup, 1973-74
KNVB Cup